Forever Autumn is the fourth studio album by the Swedish doom/gothic metal band Lake of Tears. It is dedicated to the memory of Juha Saarinen--who died four years prior to the album's release. Forever Autumn was released with a bonus track: a radio- edited version of the title track in South Korea by East Rock Records.

Track listing
All songs written by Daniel Brennare.

Personnel
 Daniel Brennare - vocals, guitar, lyrics
 Mikael Larsson - bass
 Johan Oudhuis - drums
 Christian Saarinen - keyboards

Additional musicians
Henriette Schack - cello
Bo Hülpheres - flute, accordion
Magnus Sahlgren - guitars
Christer Johansson - photography
Stig Börje Forsberg - producer
Anders Forsberg - producer, layout
Tom Müller - mastering
Ulf Wahlberg - producer, engineering
Michael Semprevivo - layout

References

1999 albums
Lake of Tears albums